The Mutiny Acts were an almost 200-year series of annual Acts passed by the Parliament of England, the Parliament of Great Britain, and the Parliament of the United Kingdom for governing, regulating, provisioning, and funding the English and later British Army.

The first Mutiny Act was passed in 1689 in response to the mutiny of a large portion of the army which stayed loyal to James II upon William III taking the crown of England. The Mutiny Act, altered in 1803, and the Articles of War defined the nature and punishment of mutiny until the latter were replaced by the Army Discipline and Regulation Act 1879. In 1881, this was in turn replaced by The Army Act - An Act to consolidate the Army Discipline and Regulation Act, 1879, and the subsequent Acts amending the Same. This was extended or amended or consolidated annually (the most recent update having been made in 1995). Today, mutiny by British forces is punished under the Armed Forces Act 2006.

Depending on events, additions, and changes within the established system more than one Mutiny Act might be passed within a given year.  Within the empire specific geographical disturbances were sometimes governed by specific Acts, such as the Mutiny, East Indies Act 1754 (27 Geo 2 c 9), or the Mutiny, America Act from 1765  (5 Geo 3 c 33) to 1776 (16 Geo 3 c 11).  A closely related series of Marine Mutiny Acts starting in 1755 (28 Geo 2 c 11) would regulate His Majesty's Marine Forces while on shore, and continue well into the 19th century.

Background
During the Middle Ages, European rulers applied the same laws to both civilian and military populations.  Because of this, military law (law governing armed forces) and martial law (control of society by the military) were not independent legal approaches. Rulers began separating the laws governing the civilian population and the laws for the armed forces as the medieval period drew to a close.

In England, William the Conqueror's Aural Regis (or King's Court) assisted him in ruling both his armed forces and the English population. Over time, this court divided and developed specialized legal expertise. King Edward I created a Court of Chivalry headed by the Lord High Constable and the Earl Marshal, two members of the King's Court. This Court of Chivalry was given authority over cases of military law, chivalry, heraldry, and murder or high treason overseas. The army was seen as the crown's personal force. Its governance, as a military force, was the crown's royal prerogative. The crown governed the military by publishing articles of war. These articles applied to the army during a specific war or campaign. The Court of Chivalry assisted the crown by preparing these articles and enforcing them. Therefore, military law could and would change depending on the campaign or war. Although harsh, the articles were clear in their expectations for military personnel.

Meanwhile, courts of equity and courts of common law developed and were given authority to govern civilians. Common law did not have rules specific to military forces and common law courts could not apply military rules. However, prior to the Petition of Right, and especially during the reign of the Tudors and Stuarts, the crown would applied articles of war (which defined the military law) against civilians in Britain in trials administered by courts-martial (an exercise of martial law). The capricious use of harsh military law by the crown against civilians included the imposition of the death penalty. The practice of enforcing military law against civilians and the usurpation of common-law courts' authority by courts-martial caused an outcry. The lack of a distinction between military law and martial law caused English legal minds to attack the exercise of military law during peacetime. William Blackstone complained,

This abuse of the crown's prerogative (the crown's right to make and enforce rules for the military) caused Parliament to pass the Petition of Right in 1628. This Act stated that neither civilians nor soldiers and officers who were in England during peace were subject to military courts or law. Only common-law courts and courts of equity could exercise authority over individuals in peacetime England. Because the articles of war did not fall under these court's jurisdiction, military law couldn't be applied to anyone in England, whether soldier or civilian.

Passage of the first Mutiny Act

King William III replaced King James II in 1688 during the Glorious Revolution.

The Royal Scots was the only unit in which the majority of personnel remained loyal to James II, whom they held to still be the true monarch. The regiment's Commanding Officer, Colonel George Douglas, 1st Earl of Dumbarton, followed James II into exile and one of William's subordinates, Frederick Schomberg, was appointed Colonel. While awaiting transport from Ipswich to Flanders, the regiment mutinied on 15 March 1689 and marched home (the Kingdom of Scotland still being strictly an independent country), refusing to obey orders from William III to fight in Holland. The mutinous troops were located in England during peacetime so only common law and courts of equity had authority over them. However, these courts' power did not include the ability to enforce penalties against mutiny (which was a military law crime and not a common law crime). Therefore, no legal action could be taken to stop or punish the troops.

Parliament responded by passing the Mutiny Act 1688 (1 Will & Mar c 5 ). This Act made desertion, mutiny, and sedition of officers and soldiers crimes triable by court-martial in peacetime England and made such crimes punishable by death. The passage of this Act initiated the codification of military law in Great Britain.

Payment for quartering the troops was first included in the Mutiny Act 1692 (4 Will & Mar c 13).

Renewal of the Mutiny Acts

Because the Bill of Rights, while prohibiting the existence of a standing army during peacetime without the consent of Parliament, did not prohibit the same in time of war, the Mutiny Act was expressly limited to one year's duration, so that, in either case, war or peace, military discipline could not be enforced, thereby making a standing army impossible for the Crown to maintain.  As a result, Parliament annually passed a new Mutiny Act. The Articles of War, published by the Crown, continued to govern military forces outside colonies overseas while the Mutiny Acts imposed military law on military forces in peacetime England. Many other changes occurred during this transition from absolute monarchy to constitutional monarchy, which were "products of the exigencies and opportunities of the quarter century of warfare on the grand scale that commenced with the accession of William and Mary, when England, and then Britain, was able "to set out such Fleets and Armies as were never heard of among our Ancestors.""

A new Mutiny Act was passed each year until 1879. The Mutiny Act was modified early on to allow courts-martial for other military crimes besides mutiny, sedition, and desertion. Modifications to the Mutiny Act allowed courts-martial trial of soldiers for acts prohibited by the Crown’s articles of war, as long as the articles conformed to the Mutiny Act 1718. Civilians who were closely associated to the military, such as victuallers, could also be tried by courts-martial.

In 1807 all serving black soldiers recruited as slaves in the West India Regiments of the British Army were freed under that year's Mutiny Act.

The Quartering Acts
The Mutiny Acts 1765 and 1774 are better known as Quartering Acts because of the changes which added quartering requirements for British troops in the American Colonies, beyond what the Army had provided.

List

The Mutiny Act 1703 (2 & 3 Anne c 20)
The Mutiny Act 1753 (26 Geo 2 c 5)
The Mutiny Act 1755 (28 Geo 2 c 4)
The Mutiny Act 1756 (29 Geo 2 c 3)
The Mutiny Act 1759 (33 Geo 2 c 6)
The Mutiny Act 1760 (1 Geo 3 c 6)
The Mutiny Act 1761 (2 Geo 3 c 11)
The Mutiny Act 1762 (3 Geo 3 c 7)
The Mutiny Act 1763 (4 Geo 3 c 3)
The Mutiny Act 1778 (18 Geo 3 c 4)
The Mutiny Act 1786 (26 Geo 3 c 10)
The Mutiny Act 1793 (33 Geo 3 c 9)
The Mutiny Act 1800 (39 & 40 Geo 3 c 27)
The Mutiny Act 1803  (43 Geo 3 c 20)
The Mutiny Act 1804 (44 Geo 3 c 19)
The Mutiny Act 1805 (45 Geo 3 c 16)
The Mutiny Act 1808 (48 Geo 3 c 15)
The Mutiny Act 1810 (50 Geo 3 c 7)
The Mutiny Act 1811 (51 Geo 3 c 8)
The Mutiny Act 1812 (52 Geo 3 c 22)
The Mutiny Act 1815 (55 Geo 3 c 108)
The Mutiny Act 1816 (56 Geo 3 c 10)
The Mutiny Act 1817 (57 Geo 3 c 35)
The Mutiny Act 1819 (59 Geo 3 c 9)
The Mutiny Act 1822 (3 Geo 4 c 13)
The Mutiny Act 1829 (10 Geo 4 c 6)
The Mutiny Act 1830 (1 Will 4 c 15)
The Mutiny Act 1832 (2 & 3 Will 4 c 28)
The Mutiny Act 1839 (2 & 3 Vict c 5) 
The Mutiny Act 1841 (4 & 5 Vict c 2) 
The Mutiny Act 1842 (5 & 6 Vict c 12)
The Mutiny Act 1843 (6 & 7 Vict c 3)
The Mutiny Act 1846 (9 & 10 Vict c 11)
The Mutiny Act 1847 (10 & 11 Vict c 12) 
The Mutiny Act 1848 (11 & 12 Vict c 11)
The Mutiny Act 1849 (12 & 13 Vict c 10)
The Mutiny Act 1853 (16 & 17 Vict c 9)
The Mutiny Act 1854 (17 & 18 Vict c 4)
The Mutiny Act 1856 (19 & 20 Vict c 10)
The Mutiny Act 1857 (20 Vict c 13)
The Mutiny Act 1858 (21 & 22 Vict c 9)
The Mutiny Act 1859 (22 Vict c 4)
The Mutiny Act 1860 (23 & 24 Vict c 9)
The Mutiny Act 1861 (24 & 25 Vict c 7)
The Mutiny Act 1862 (25 & 26 Vict c 5)
The Mutiny Act 1863 (26 & 27 Vict c 8)
The Mutiny Act 1864 (27 & 28 Vict c 3)
The Mutiny Act 1865 (28 & 29 Vict c 11)
The Mutiny Act 1866 (29 & 30 Vict c 9)
The Mutiny Act 1867 (30 & 31 Vict c 13)
The Mutiny Act 1868 (31 & 32 Vict c 14)
The Mutiny Act 1869 (32 & 33 Vict c 4)
The Mutiny Act 1870 (33 & 34 Vict c 7)
The Mutiny Act 1871 (34 & 35 Vict c 9)
The Mutiny Act 1872 (35 & 36 Vict c 3)
The Mutiny Act 1873 (36 & 37 Vict c 10)
The Mutiny Act 1874 (37 & 38 Vict c 4)
The Mutiny Act 1875 (38 & 39 Vict c 7)
The Mutiny Act 1876 (39 & 40 Vict c 8)
The Mutiny Act 1877 (40 & 41 Vict c 7)
The Mutiny Act 1878 (41 & 42 Vict c 10)

Marine Mutiny Acts
The Marine Mutiny Acts included the following Acts of the Parliament of the United Kingdom:
The Marine Mutiny Act 1840 (3 & 4 Vict c 8)
The Marine Mutiny Act 1860 (23 & 24 Vict c 10)
The Marine Mutiny Act 1861 (24 & 25 Vict c 8)
The Marine Mutiny Act (1862) (25 & 26 Vict c 6)
The Marine Mutiny Act (1863) (26 & 27 Vict c 9)

The Marine Mutiny Act 1864 (27 & 28 Vict c 4)
The Marine Mutiny Act 1866 (29 & 30 Vict c 10)
The Marine Mutiny Act 1868 (31 & 32 Vict c 15)
The Marine Mutiny Act 1869 (32 & 33 Vict c 5)
The Marine Mutiny Act 1870 (33 & 34 Vict c 8)
The Marine Mutiny Act 1871 (34 & 35 Vict c 10)
The Marine Mutiny Act 1872 (35 & 36 Vict c 4)

The Marine Mutiny Act 1873 (36 & 37 Vict c 11)
The Marine Mutiny Act 1874 (37 & 38 Vict c 5)
The Marine Mutiny Act (1875) (38 & 39 Vict c 8). Also called the Royal Marines on shore Act.
The Marine Mutiny Act 1876 (39 & 40 Vict c 9)
The Marine Mutiny Act 1877 (40 & 41 Vict c 8)
The Marine Mutiny Act 1878 (41 & 42 Vict c 11)

See also
 Incitement to Mutiny Act 1797
 Army Act

References
Report from the Select Committee on Mutiny and Marine Mutiny Acts. 26 July 1878. (C 316). Reports from Committees. Session 17 January to 16 August 1878. Volume 10. Page 253.

1689 in law
Acts of the Parliament of England
Acts of the Parliament of Great Britain
Acts of the Parliament of the United Kingdom
United Kingdom military law